Julia Freeman (born 1963), is a female former cyclist who competed for England.

Athletics career
Freeman represented England in the road race and won a bronze medal in the team time trial event, at the 1994 Commonwealth Games in Victoria, British Columbia, Canada.

She rides for the Easterly Road Cycling Club.

References

1963 births
Living people
English female cyclists
Commonwealth Games medallists in cycling
Commonwealth Games bronze medallists for England
Cyclists at the 1994 Commonwealth Games
Medallists at the 1994 Commonwealth Games